Mahendra Dalvi is an Indian politician serving as Member of the Maharashtra Legislative Assembly from Alibag Vidhan Sabha constituency as a member of Shiv Sena.

Positions held
 2019: Elected to Maharashtra Legislative Assembly

References

External links
  Shivsena Home Page 

Living people
Members of the Maharashtra Legislative Assembly
Shiv Sena politicians
Year of birth missing (living people)